Montigny-sur-Avre (literally Montigny on Avre) is a commune in the Eure-et-Loir department in northern France.

Population

See also
 Communes of the Eure-et-Loir department

References

FRancois Laval

Communes of Eure-et-Loir